The L number ("L" standing for Land Service) or weapon identity number system is a numerical designation system used for the type classification of British Army weapons and related stores. The L number in isolation is not a unique identifier; the L1 designation alone is used for a rifle and its corresponding bayonet and blank-firing attachment, a machine gun, a tank gun, a sighting telescope, an anti-riot grenade, three separate rocket systems, a necklace demolition charge, a hand-thrown flare, a fuze setter head, and two separate types of user-filled demolition charge among other stores, while the L10 designation was used for three separate calibres of blank cartridge. Rather, the number is used in conjunction with a description, e.g. "Rifle, 7.62mm, L1A1" or "L1A1 7.62mm Rifle". The A number following the L number refers to the particular version of a piece of equipment; unlike some similar designation systems used by other countries where an A number is only used for subsequent versions of equipment, an A1 designation is always used for the first version to be officially adopted. Stores coming into Army service began receiving Land Service designations in 1954, replacing the old number-and-mark system of designations.

Some weapons such as the AR-15 and M16A2 rifles, C3 Non-Metallic Anti-Personnel Mine, M18A1 Anti-Personnel Mine, M79 grenade launcher, M6-895 and M6-640 mortars, were not given L numbers and are referred to in official documentation by their manufacturer's designations instead. Likewise, legacy items such as the No.5 Mk 1 Bayonet, No. 8 Mk 1 0.22in Rifle, No. 80 Mk 1 White Phosphorus Smoke Hand Grenade, No. 1 Mk 3 6 Inch Beehive Demolition Charge, and No. 14 Mk 1 11 lb Hayrick Demolition Charge that were given designations under the earlier number-and-mark system continued to be referred to by those designations until replacement.

Equivalent designation systems were devised for the Royal Navy ("N", standing for Naval Service) and the Royal Air Force ("A", standing for Air Service), though in many cases stores used across all three branches were and are referred to by Land Service designations; Land Service designations have also been used where no Army equivalent exists, as in the case of the L44A1. A number of guided weapons in service with British forces such as K170 NLAW and K130 HVM have received a "K" designation that parallels the "L" designation applied to unguided weapons. The FV (fighting vehicle) number series is similar in purpose but not in formatting. Similar designation systems are used by various other militaries; for example, Canada uses "C" ("C" standing for Canadian), Australia uses "F" ("F" standing for Forces), though some stores did receive "L" designations particularly where they were of British origin, and several nations such as Denmark, South Africa, and the United States of America use or used "M" ("M" standing for Model or its non-English equivalent).

Firearms 
 L1
 L1A1 7.62mm Self Loading Rifle (SLR) (Also referred to as the L1A1 7.62mm Rifle)
 L1A1-A4 Bayonet (For use with the SLR)
 L1A1/A2 Blank Firing Attachment (For use with the SLR)
 L1A1/A2 .50 inch Machine Gun (Also referred to as the L1A1/A2 12.7mm Heavy Machine Gun)
 L1A1 .50 inch Anti-Aircraft Machine Gun Mounting (For use with the L1A1 MG)
 L1A1 Vehicle Stand (For use with the L1A1 MG)
 L1A1/A2 84mm AT4 (CS) HP Rocket System (Also referred to as the L1A1/A2 Interim Light Anti-tank Weapon (ILAW))
 L1 120mm rifled gun - used on Conqueror tank
 L1A1/A2/A3 66mm HEAT Rocket and Launcher (Also referred to as the L1 66mm Section Anti-Tank Rocket)
 L1A1 66mm Sub-Calibre 21mm Adaptor (Training adaptor for L1 66mm HEAT Rocket)
 L1A1/A2/A3 Irritant Anti-Riot Hand Grenade
 L1A1 Straight Sighting Telescope (Modified No. 32 Mk 3 Sighting Telescope as used with the L42A1 rifle)
 L1A1 Illuminating Hand Thrown Flare
 L1A1 Necklace Demolition Charge
 L1A1 94mm HEAT Rocket System
 L1A1 8 kg Linear User Filled Demolition Charge
 L1A1 12 kg Conical User Filled Demolition Charge
 L1E1 Area Defence Projector
 L1A1-A4 Handheld Pressurized Irritant Canister
 L1A1 Fuze Setter Head, NSN 1290-99-967-0882
 L1A1 IR Torch
 L1A1 IR Section Torch
 L1A1 Small Arms Bore Cleaning Brush
 L1A1 Instantaneous Fuze
 L1A1/A2/A3 Safety Fuze
 L1A1 Detonating Cord
 L1A1/A2 Non-Electric Demolition Detonator (Also referred to as the L1A1/A2 Plain Detonator)
 L1A1 Smoke Generator
 L1A1/A2 9mm Magazine (Magazine for use with the L2 submachine gun; L1A1 magazines were manufactured by Sterling while L1A2 magazines were variously manufactured by ROF Fazakerley, Royal Laboratories Woolwich, Rolls Razor, and Mettoy)
 L1A1/A2/A3 Image Intensified Weapon Sight (Also referred to as the L1 Individual Weapon Sight (IWS), L1 Image Intensified Weaponsight, or L1 Individual Weaponsight)
 L1A1 Image Intensified Weapon Sight Mount (Mount for L1 IWS to be used with the L7 GPMG)
 L1A1 Safety Unit (Attached to L44A1)
 L1A1 7.62mm Machine Gun Tools and Accessories Roll (L7 GPMG tool roll)
 L1A1 Small Arms Cleaning Rod
 L1A1 Small Arms Collimator (For use with SUSAT and CWS on the SA80 series)
 L2
 L2A1/A2 High Explosive Hand Grenade (Also referred to as the L2A1/A2 Anti-Personnel Hand Grenade, which is particularly apparent on the grenade markings)
 L2A1 7.62mm Automatic Rifle
 L2A1 84mm HE (CS) Rocket (Also referred to as the L2A1 ILAW)
 L2A1 Anti-Structures Munition
 L2A1 7.62mm Rifle
 L2A1/A2/A3 9mm Submachine Gun
 L2A1/A2 Trilux Infantry Sight Unit (Abbreviated to SUIT after "Sight Unit, Infantry, Trilux")
 L2A1 Irritant One Shot Hand-Held Discharger
 L2A1 .30 in. Machine Gun Tripod Mounting (Tripod mounting for L3 Machine Gun series)
 L2A1 0.22in Aiming Rifle (No. 8 rifles converted for Royal Armoured Corps miniature range training via removal of iron sights and furniture)
 L2A1 Laser Range-Finder
 L2A1 Paint Marker Hand Grenade
 L2A1 Light Non-Metallic Anti-Tank Mine
 L2A1/A2 Electric Demolition Detonator
 L2A1 Image Intensified Weapon Sight (Also referred to as the L2A1 Individual Weapon Sight (IWS))
 L2A1 Image Intensified Weapon Sight Mount (Mount for L1 IWS to be used with the L14 anti-tank gun)
 L2A1 7.62mm Magazine (For use with the L1A1 SLR)
 L2A1 Drill Necklace Demolition Charge (Drill version of the L1A1 Necklace Charge)
 L2A1 Ground Stand (For use with the L1A1 MG)
 L2A1 Practice Anti-Tank Mine
 L2A1 Small Arms Collimator (For use with the telescopic sight and CWS on the L96 rifle)
 L3
  L3A1-A4 .30 in Machine Gun
 L3A1 Bayonet (Used with the L85 rifle; can also be attached to the L129A1 via an adaptor)
 L3A1 Non-Metallic Anti-Tank Mine (Also referred to as the L3A1 Anti-Tank Mine or the L3A1 Lightweight Non-Metallic Anti-Tank Mine)
 L3A1 Anti-Tank Mine Clearing Equipment
 L3A1 PE4 Slab Demolition Charge
 L3A1/A2/A3 Handheld Electronic D.C. Exploder
 L3A1/A2/A3 Practice Hand Grenade (Training version of the L2 HE/APERS Hand Grenade)
 L3A1/A2 Flash Initiator
 L3A1 Image Intensified Weapon Sight Mount (Mount for L1 IWS to be used with the AR-15 rifle; there is no relation to the L3A1 Weapon Sight below)
 L3A1 Image Intensified Weapon Sight (Also referred to as the L3A1 Crew Served Weapon Sight)
 L3A1 Small Arms Collimator (For use with the iron sights and CWS on the SA80 series)
 L4
 L4 183 mm anti-tank gun used on FV4005 prototype
 L4A1-A9 7.62mm Light Machine Gun (7.62mm Bren conversions; designation often simplified to "L4 7.62mm Machine Gun")
 L4A1 7.62mm Magazine (For use with the above)
 L4A1 Drill Slab Demolition Charge (Drill version of the L3A1 Slab Charge)
 L4A1/A2 Drill Hand Grenade (Drill version of the L2 HE/APERS Hand Grenade)
 L4A1 Flash Initiator
 L4A1 Image Intensified Weapon Sight Mount (Mount for L1 IWS to be used with the L1 SLR)
 L4A1 Image Intensified Weapon Sight Case (Case for L1 IWS; also referred to as the L4 Image Intensified Weaponsight Case)
 L4A1 Cased Image Intensified Weapon Sight (L1 IWS with case and accessories; also referred to as the L4 Cased Image Intensified Weaponsight or the L4 Cased Image Intensified Straight Telescope)
 L4A1 Machine Gun Tripod Mounting (Tripod mount for L7)
 L4A1 Image Intensified Weapon Sight Adaptor (Mount for the L5 and L6 sights; Also referred to as the L4 Image Intensified Weaponsight Adaptor)
 L5
 L5A1/A2/A3 Trilux 7.62mm Rifle Sight Conversion Kit (Used with the SLR, also referred to as the L5 Trilux Foresight)
 L5A1-A4 Illuminating Parachute Hand Fired Rocket
 L5A1 Combination Demolition Firing Device
 L5A1 Detonating Cord
 L5A1 Image Intensified Weapon Sight Mount (Mount for L1 IWS to be used with the L42A1 rifle; there is no relation to the L5A1 Weapon Sight below)
 L5A1 Incendiary Destructor
 L5A1 Image Intensified Weapon Sight (Also referred to as the L5A1 Image Intensified Weaponsight or L5A1 Pocketscope)
 L5A1 Adaptor (Adaptor for the L5 and L6 sights)
 L6
 L6A1 12.7mm Ranging machine gun for 105mm tank gun on Centurion tank
 L6A1 Blank Firing Attachment
 L6A1 Image Intensified Straight Telescope (Also referred to as the L6A1 Pocketscope)
 L6A1 Adaptor (Adaptor for the L5 and L6 sights)
 L7
 L7A1/A2 7.62mm General Purpose Machine Gun (GPMG)
 L7A1 105mm Tank Gun (Centurion tank armament)
 L7A1 Rapid Bridge Demolition Charge
 L8
 L8A1/A2 7.62mm Machine Gun, L7 for AFV use
 L8A1-A5 7.62mm Rifle (7.62mm Lee-Enfield conversions)
 L8A1-A4 Screening Smoke Discharger Grenade
 L8A1/A2 Image Intensified Weapon Sight (Also referred to as the L8 Image Intensified Weaponsight or the L8 Common Weapon Sight)
 L8A1 Image Intensified Weapon Sight Mount (Mount for the L5 and L6 sights; Also referred to as the L8 Image Intensified Weaponsight Mount)
 L9
 L9A1 9mm Automatic Pistol
 L9A1 51mm Light Mortar
 L9 165mm Demolition gun
 L9A1 Trilux Small Arms Sight Unit (Abbreviated to SUSAT after "Sight Unit, Small Arms, Trilux") (Version with 100-600m range settings)
 L9A1-A8 HE Blast Anti-Tank Mine
 L10
 L10A1 Anti-Personnel Mine
 L10A1/A2 Tripwire Flare Kit
 L10A1 Illuminating Parachute Hand Fired Rocket
 L10A1 Detonating Cord Booster
 L10A1/A2 General Purpose Machine Gun Mount
 L10A1/A2 Image Intensified Weapon Sight Case (Also referred to as the L10 Image Intensified Weaponsight Case)
 L11
 L11A1 9mm Automatic Pistol Kit (L9A1 pistol with accessories)
 L11A1 12.7mm Machine Gun (0.50 inch M2 Browning machine gun for use as ranging gun)
 L11A1-A6 120mm Rifled Gun
 L11A1 Rapid Bridge Demolition Charge
 L11A1 Blank Ammunition Firing Attachment (For use with the SA80 series)
 L11A1 Illuminating Parachute Hand Fired Rocket
 L11A1 Long Range Irritant Anti-Riot Discharger Grenade
 L11A1 Tripwire Flare Simulator Kit (Practice version of the L10A1 Tripwire Kit)
 L11A1 Cased Image Intensified Weapon Sight (L5 Weapon Sight in case with accessories; Also referred to as the L11 Cased Image Intensified Weaponsight)
 L11A1 Gun and Mortar Fire Simulator
L12
 L12A1 0.22 inch Calibre 7.62mm Rifle Conversion Kit (.22 inch conversion kit for the L1A1 SLR; occasionally, "5.60mm" could be used in place of "0.22 inch")
 L12A1  Trilux Small Arms Sight Unit (Version with 300-800m range settings)
 L12A1/A2 Illuminating Parachute Hand Fired Rocket
 L12A1 Rapid Bridge Demolition Charge
 L12A1 Cased Image Intensified Weapon Sight (L6 Telescope in case with accessories; Also referred to as the L11 Cased Image Intensified Weaponsight)
 L13
 L13A1 5.56mm SA80-series blank fire attachment
 L13A1 105mm gun used on FV433 Abbot self-propelled gun
 L13A1/A2 Irritant Anti-Riot Hand Grenade
 L13A1 Irritant Hand Held Jet Spray
 L13A1 Telescope (Schmidt & Bender 6 x 42, primary sighting system for the L96 rifle prior to its 2000 upgrade; also referred to as the L13 Telescopic Sight)
 L13A1 Illuminating Parachute Rocket
 L13A1 Gun and Mortar Fire Simulator
 L14A1
 L14A1 Anti-Tank Mine
 L14A1 40mm Multi Shot Grenade Launcher (MSGL)
 L14A1 84mm Infantry Anti-Tank Gun (Also referred to as the L14A1 84mm Medium Anti-Tank Weapon)
 L14A1 Small Arms General Purpose Cleaning Brush
 L14A1/A2 Cased Image Intensified Weapon Sight (L8 Weapon Sight in L10 case with accessories; Also referred to as the L14 Cased Image Intensified Weaponsight)
 L14A1 Image Intensified Weapon Sight Mount (Used to mount the L8 Weapon Sight on the L96 rifle; Also referred to as the L14A1 Image Intensified Weaponsight Mount)
 L15
 L15A1 Rifle Grenade Launcher Sight (Attached to a SUSAT scope for use with the Rifle Grenade General Service series)
 L15A1 Small Arms Cleaning Brush
 L16
 L16A1/A2 81mm Mortar
 L16A1/A2 Practice Anti-Riot Hand Grenade (Training version of L13 grenade)
 L16A1 Flash and Sound Armoured Fighting Vehicle Gunfire Simulator
 L17
L17A1 40mm Underslung Grenade Launcher
L17A2 40mm Underslung Grenade Launcher (Initial designation for the AG-SA80/L123 launcher)
 L17A1 HE Blast Anti-Tank Mine
L17A1/A2 Telescope (Schmidt & Bender 3-12 x 50, primary sighting system for the L96 rifle following its 2000 upgrade, the L118 rifle, and the L129 SSW, and capable of being retrofitted onto the L115 rifle; also referred to as the L17 Telescopic Sight)
 L17A1 Blank Ammunition Firing Attachment
 L18
 L18A1 9mm Automatic Pistol
 L18A1 HE Blast Anti-Tank Mine
 L18A1/A2 Optical Sight (Sighting system on L104 Riot Gun)
 L18A1/A2 Flash and Sound Armoured Fighting Vehicle Gunfire Simulator
 L18A1 Gun and Mortar Fire Simulator
 L19
 L19A1 7.62mm General Purpose Machine Gun (Heavy-barrelled variant of the L7 GPMG)
 L19A1 Small Arms Fire Simulator
 L20
 L20A1/A2 7.62mm Machine Gun (L7A1/A2 variant for use in gun pods and other external mounts)
 L20A1 PE7 Block Demolition Charge
 L20A1 Explosion Simulator
 L21
 L21A1  30mm Gun
 L21A1 PE7 Slab Demolition Charge
 L21A1 Drill Anti-Tank Mine (Drill version of L9, L17, and L18 anti-tank mines)
 L21A1 5.56mm Magazine (Radway Green STANAG magazine for the SA80 series)
 L21A1 Small Arms Strike Simulator
 L22
 L22A1/A2 5.56mm Carbine
 L22A1 PE8 Slab Demolition Charge
 L22A1 Red Distress Signal Hand Fired Rocket
 L22A1 Small Arms Ricochet Simulator
 L23
 L23A1 76mm gun, as used on Scorpion light tank
 L23A1 Load Circuit Fault Locating Tool
 L23A1 94mm Rocket Fire Simulator
 L24
 L24A1 300m Illuminating Parachute Hand Fired Rocket
 L24A1 12.7mm machine gun Ranging drill version.
 L24A1 Telescope (Schmidt & Bender 5-25 x 56, primary sighting system for the L115 rifle; also referred to as the L24 Telescopic Sight)
 L24A1 5.56mm Magazine (Heckler & Koch STANAG magazine for the SA80 series and M16 series)
 L25
 L25A1/A2 Rapid Cratering Explosive Kit
 L25A1 600m IR Illuminating Parachute Hand Fired Rocket
 L25A1 Instructional Rifle (Sectionalised version of the L1A1 SLR)
 L25A1 5.56mm Magazine (Heckler & Koch STANAG magazine for blank ammunition)
 L25A1 Electric Safety Fuze Igniter
 L25A1 PE7 Drill Slab Demolition Charge
 L26
 L26A1 Bangalore Torpedo Demolition Charge 
 L26A1 Instructional Rifle (Variant of the L25A1 instructional rifle)
 L26A1 Rarden 30mm cannon
 L26A1 "Jericho" APFSDS round for the L11A5 rifled gun on the Challenger 1 tank.
 L26A1 5.56mm Magazine (Twenty-round magazine for the L22A2 carbine)
 L27
 L27A1 Anti-Tank Mine Kit (Consisting of two L14A1 Anti-Tank Mines and accessories)
 L27A1 Drill Bangalore Torpedo Demolition Charge
 L28
 L28A1 Practice Anti-Tank Mine Kit (Practice version of the L27A1 Anti-Tank Mine Kit)
 L28A1 Drill Hand Grenade (Later drill version of the L2 HE/APERS Hand Grenade)
 L28A1 Instructional Bangalore Torpedo Demolition Charge
 L28A1 Large Hand Battle Noise Simulator
 L29
 L29A1/A2 Instructional Anti-Tank Mine Kit (Instructional version of the L27A1 Anti-Tank Mine Kit)
 L29A1 Electric Battle Noise Simulator
 L30
 L30A1 120mm Challenger Armament (CHARM) Gun
 L32
 L32A1 12 Bore Automatic Shotgun
 L34
 L34A1 9mm Submachine Gun (Silenced version of L2A3)
 L35
 L35A1 Shielder Vehicle Launched Scatterable Mine System
 L35A1/A2 Blue Signal Smoke Hand Grenade
 L35A1 Battle Sound Simulator
 L36
 L36A1/A2 Green Signal Smoke Hand Grenade
 L37
 L37A1/A2 7.62mm General Purpose Machine Gun (Variant of L7 GPMG for AFVs, e.g. Challenger 2).
 L37A1 Red Signal Smoke Hand Grenade
 L38
 L38A1 7.62mm Drill Rifle (Drill purpose version of the L1A1 SLR)
 L38A1/A2 Yellow Signal Smoke Hand Grenade
 L39
 L39A1 7.62mm Rifle (7.62mm NATO conversion of Rifle No. 4, Marks 1/2 and 2, used for target rifle competition)
 L41
 L41A1/A2 0.22 inch Calibre 5.56mm Rifle Conversion Kit (.22 inch conversion kit for SA80-pattern weapons;  also referred to as the L41A1/A2 .22 inch Calibre SA 80 5.56mm Rifle and LSW Conversion Kit)
 L41A1-A4 Demolition Grip Firing Device Kit
 L42
 L42A1 7.62mm Rifle (7.62mm NATO conversion of Rifle No. 4, Marks I (T) and I* (T), standard sniper rifle from 1970 to 1992; also referred as the L42A1 7.62mm Sniper Rifle)
 L43
 L43A1 7.62mm Machine Gun (L7 variant used on the Scorpion as a ranging gun)
 L44
 L44A1 7.62mm Machine Gun (Royal Navy L7 variant fitted with L1A1 Safety Unit and No. 1 Mk 1 Electrical Firing Unit, normally pintle-mounted or set in remote gun pods)
 L45
 L45A1 7.62mm Drill Machine Gun (Drill purpose version of L7)
 L46
 L46A1 7.62mm Drill Machine Gun (Drill purpose version of L7)
 L47
 L47A1 7.65mm Automatic Pistol
 L47A1 Universal Cleaning Kit
 L49
 L49A1 9mm Drill Submachine Gun (Drill purpose version of the L2A3 converted from unserviceable weapons)
 L49A1 Minefield Perimeter Marking Kit 
 L50
 L50A1 9mm Drill Purpose Machine Carbine (Drill purpose version of the Sten Mk II)
 L50A1 Smoke Screening/Marker Hand Grenade
 L51
 L51A1 9mm Drill Purpose Machine Carbine (Drill purpose version of the Sten Mk III)
 L52
 L52A1 9mm Drill Purpose Machine Carbine (Drill purpose version of the Sten Mk V)
 L52A1/A2 Blue Signal Smoke Hand Grenade
 L53
 L53A1/A2 Green Signal Smoke Hand Grenade
 L54
 L54A1/A2 Red Signal Smoke Hand Grenade
 L55
 L55A1/A2/A3 Orange Signal Smoke Hand Grenade
 L55A1 120mm Gun
 L56
 L56A1 Practice Hand Grenade (Later training version of the L2 HE/APERS Hand Grenade with a rubber body)
 L59
 L59A1 Drill Purpose Rifle
 L60
 L60A1 40mm Target Practice Marker Grenade (Training variant of the L74A1 HEAT Grenade)
 L64
 L64A1 Green Signal Smoke Hand Grenade
 L65
 L65A1 Orange Signal Smoke Hand Grenade
 L66
 L66A1 .22in Automatic Pistol
 L66A1 Red Signal Smoke Hand Grenade
 L67
 L67A1-A4 37mm Riot Gun (Also referred to as the L67 1.5" Riot Gun)
 L67A1 Blue Signal Smoke Hand Grenade
 L68
 L68A1 Green Signal Smoke Hand Grenade
 L69
 L69A1 Orange Signal Smoke Hand Grenade
 L70
 L70A1 Red Signal Smoke Hand Grenade
 L71
 L71A1 Blue Signal Smoke Hand Grenade
 L72
 L72A9 Light Anti-Structures Missile (LASM) (M72A9)
 L72A1 Training Smoke Screening Hand Grenade
 L73
 L73A1/A2 Training Smoke Screening Hand Grenade
 L74
 L74A1/A2 12 Bore Shotgun
 L74A1 40mm HEAT Grenade (Used with the L85 rifle until the introduction of the Rifle Grenade General Service series)
 L75
 L75A1 40mm HEAT-APERS Grenade (Used with the L85 rifle until the introduction of the Rifle Grenade General Service series)
 L78
 L78A1 White Light Stabilised Illumination Device Flare Kit
 L79
 L79A1 Infra-Red Stabilised Illumination Device Flare Kit
 L80
 L80A1 9mm Submachine Gun (MP5K)
 L80A1 Drill Stabilised Illumination Device Flare Kit
 L81
 L81A1/A2 7.62mm Cadet Target Rifle (Sometimes simplified to L81 7.62mm Rifle)
 L83
 L83A1/A2 Training Smoke Screening Hand Grenade
 L84
 L84A1/A2/A3 Red Phosphorus Smoke Screening Hand Grenade (Rheinmetall SPIRCO)
 L85
 L85A1/A2/A3 5.56mm Rifle (Also referred to as the L85 5.56mm Individual Weapon)
 L85A1 HE Rifle Grenade used with the L85 rifle until the introduction of the L123 UGL
 L86
 L86A1/A2 5.56mm Light Support Weapon (Also referred to as the L86 5.56mm Machine Gun)
 L86A1 Practice Rifle Grenade (Practice version of the L85A1 Rifle Grenade)
 L87A1
 L87A1 Inert Practice Rifle Grenade (Inert version of the L85A1 Rifle Grenade)
 L89
 L89A1 9mm Automatic Pistol (Instructional version of the L9A1 pistol)
 L89A1 16mm White Pyrotechnic Signal Kit
 L90
 L90A1 9mm Submachine Gun (MP5KA1)
 L90A1 16mm Green Pyrotechnic Signal Kit
 L91
 L91A1 9mm Submachine Gun (MP5SD3)
 L91A1 16mm Red Pyrotechnic Signal Kit
 L92
 L92A1 9mm Submachine Gun (MP5A3)
 L94
 L94A1 7.62mm Machine Gun (Hughes EX34 chain gun)
 L95
 L95 another variant of the Chain gun
 L96
 L96A1/A2 7.62mm Rifle (Also referred as the L96 7.62mm Sniper Rifle)
 L98
 L98A1/A2 5.56mm Cadet General Purpose Rifle (A1 is single shot, no longer in use; A2 is semi-automatic, replaced A1 from 2009 onwards)
 L98A1 Irritant Anti-Riot Hand Grenade
 L100
 L100A1 Yellow Signal Smoke Hand Grenade
 L100A1/A2 7.62mm Rifle (G3KA4)
 L101
 L101A1 Purple Signal Smoke Hand Grenade
 L101A1/A2 5.56mm Rifle (HK53) (Also referred to as the L101 5.56mm Submachine Gun)
 L102
 L102A1 9mm Automatic Pistol (Walther P5 Compact)
 L103
 L103A1/A2 Drill Purpose (DP) Rifle (Drill purpose variant of the L98A1 and L98A2 GP rifles)
 L104
  L104A1/A2 37mm Riot Gun
 L105
 L105A1/A2 9mm Automatic Pistol (SIG Sauer P226)
 L106
 L106A1/A2 9mm Automatic Pistol (SIG Sauer P226 with corrosion-resistant finish)
 L106A1 Distraction Hand Grenade
 L107
 L107A1 9mm Automatic Pistol (SIG Sauer P228)
 L107A1 Distraction Hand Grenade
 L108A1
 L108A1 5.56mm Light Machine Gun
 L108A1/A2 Practice Distraction Hand Grenade (Training version of the L107A1 Distraction Hand Grenade)
 L109
 L109A1 9mm Automatic Pistol
 L109A1/A2 High Explosive Hand Grenade
 L110
 L110A1/A2/A3 5.56mm Light Machine Gun (FN Minimi Para)
 L110A1 Drill Hand Grenade (Drill version of the L109 HE Hand Grenade)
 L111
 L111A1 12.7mm Heavy Machine Gun (M2 Browning with quick-change barrel; originally referred to as the L111A1 .50 inch Machine Gun)
 L111A1 Practice Hand Grenade (Training version of the L109 HE Hand Grenade)
 L112
 L112A1 7.62mm Air Role Derivative (ARD) General Purpose Machine Gun (GPMG) (Helicopter door gun variant of the L7)
 L114
 L114A1 12.7mm Heavy Machine Gun (FN Herstal M3M)
 L115
 L115A1-A4 8.59mm Long Range Rifle (Also referred to as the L115 8.59mm Sniper Rifle, L115 8.59mm Large Calibre Long Range Rifle, or simply L115 8.59mm Rifle; additionally, "0.338in" or ".338" can be used in place of "8.59mm")
 L115A1 Practice Distraction Hand Grenade (Training version of the L106A1 Distraction Hand Grenade)
 L116
 L116A1 Drill Purpose (DP) Rifle (Drill purpose version of the L98 converted from unserviceable L85s)
 L117
 L117A1/A2 9mm Pistol (SIG Sauer P229)
L118
 L118 105mm Light Gun (Also referred to as the L118 105mm Field Gun)
 L118A1 7.62mm Counter Terrorism Sniper Rifle
 L119
 L119A1/A2 5.56mm Rifle (C8SFW and C8CQB; also referred to as the L119A1/A2 5.56mm Assault Rifle)
 L119A1 105mm Field Gun
 L121
 L121A1 12.7mm Long Range Precision Anti Structure Rifle
 L123
 L123A1/A2/A3 40mm Underslung Grenade Launcher (UGL)
 L126
 L126A1 Cadet Drill Purpose (DP) Rifle (Inert version of the L98A2 for the Sea Cadet Corps and Combined Cadet Force)
 L127
 L127A1 'Sideloader' 37mm Less Lethal Gun (based on the HK GLM)
 L128
 L128A1 12 Bore Combat Shotgun
 L129
 L129A1 7.62mm Sharpshooter Rifle (Also referred to as the L129A1 7.62mm Sharpshooter Assault Rifle)
 L129A1 7.62mm Sniper Support Weapon (Variant of the Sharpshooter Rifle outfitted with an L17 telescope and a suppressor for use by the spotter in a sniper-spotter pair)
 L130
 L130A1 7.62mm Light Machine Gun
 L131
 L131A1 9mm General Service Pistol (Glock 17 Gen4)
 L132
L132A1 9mm FX Pistol (Glock 17T (Gen4), fires Marker Round Training System (MRTS) munitions)
L132A1/A2 Smoke Screening Hand Grenade
 L134
 L134A1 40mm Grenade Machine Gun
 L135
 L135A1 12.7mm Long Range Precision Anti Structure Rifle
 L137
 L137A1 9mm Pistol (Glock 19)
 L144
 L144A1 0.22" Cadet Small Bore Target Rifle 
 L152
 L152A1 Green Signal Smoke Hand Grenade
 L153
 L153A1 Orange Signal Smoke Hand Grenade
 L154
 L154A1 Red Signal Smoke Hand Grenade
 L155
 L155A1 Yellow Signal Smoke Hand Grenade
 L157
 L157A1 Purple Signal Smoke Hand Grenade
 L158
 L158A1 Turquoise Signal Smoke Hand Grenade
 L238
 L238A1 Ammunition Container Assembly (Container with fifteen L1 66mm HEAT Rockets and Launchers)

Ammunition
 L1
 L1A1/A2 5.56mm Tracer Round (Tracer round complement to L2A1/A2)
 L1A1/A2/A3 5.56mm Blank Cartridge (Blank training round complement to L2A1/A2, also used for grenade launching)
 L1A1 5.45mm×39mm Ball Round
 L1A1 0.45 Inch Auto Colt Pistol Ball Round
 L1A1 51mm High Explosive Mortar Bomb
 L1A1 .22 inch Club Round
 L1A1 12.7mm Multi-Purpose Round
 L2
 L2A1/A2 5.56mm Ball Round
 L2A1-A4 7.62mm Ball Round
 L2A1 9mm Plastic Blank Round
 L2A1 51mm Smoke Screening Mortar Bomb
 L2A1/A2 1.5 in. Anti-Riot Baton Round
 L3
 L3A1/A2 1.5 in. Anti-Riot Baton Round
 L3A1/A2 51mm Illuminating Mortar Bomb
 L3A1 5.56mm Ball Round (M193-type round for use in AR-15 weapons and the L101A1/A2 rifle)
 L3A1 12.7mm Multi-Purpose Tracer Round
 L4
 L4A1 60mm High Explosive Mortar Bomb
 L4A1 1.5" Green Signal Cartridge
 L4A1 12.7mm Armour Piercing Incendiary Round
 L4A1 .338 inch Ball
 L5
 L5A1-A7 1.5 in. Anti-Riot Baton Round
 L5A1-A5 7.62mm Tracer Round (Tracer round complement to L2A1/A2)
 L5A1/A2 .22 inch Ball Round
 L7
 L7A1 9mm Ball Round
 L7A1 5.56mm Ball Round
 L7A1 120mm Blank Charge
 L8
 L8A1 5.56mm Blank Cartridge
 L8A1 40mm Practice Round
 L8A1-A6 12 Bore Entry Round
 L9
 L9A1 .22 inch Ball Round
 L9A1-A7 12 Bore Short Range Irritant Round
 L10
 L10A1 .303 inch Blank Cartridge
 L10A1/A2 7.62mm Blank Cartridge (Blank training round complement to L2A1/A2)
 L10A1 .30 inch Blank Cartridge
 L10A1/A2 81mm High Explosive Mortar Bomb
 L10A1-A8 12 Bore Short Range Practice Round
 L11
 L11A1/A2 .50 inch Observing Round
 L11A1 7.62mm Ball Round
 L11A1 51mm Drill Mortar Bomb (Representing L2 Smoke and L3 Illumination bombs)
 L11A1-A5 12 Bore Long Range Irritant Round
 L12
 L12A1 9mm Ball Round
 L12A1 51mm Drill Mortar Bomb (Representing L1 HE bombs)
 L13
 L13A1-A4 7.62mm Blank Cartridge (Blank training round complement to L2A1/A2)
 L14
 L14A1 7.62mm Blank Cartridge
 L15
 L15A1/A2 5.56mm Ball Round (FN SS109-type round optimised for use in AR-15 weapons such as the L119A1/A2 rifle)
 L15A1-A4 81mm High Explosive Mortar Bomb
 L15A1-A4 155mm High Explosive Shell
 L15A1-A5 120mm Armour-Piercing Discarding-Sabot Tank Shot
 L16
 L16A1 5.56mm Tracer Round (Tracer round complement to L15A1/A2 and L17A1/A2)
 L16A1 51mm Illuminating Mortar Bomb
 L16A1 7.62mm Ball Round
 L17
 L17A1/A2 5.56mm Ball Round (FN SS109-type round optimised for use with SA80 weapons)
 L18
 L18A1 5.56mm Blank Cartridge (Blank training round complement to L17A1/A2)
 L18A1 9mm Ball Round
 L19
 L19A1 81mm White Phosphorus Smoke Screening Mortar Bomb
 L21
 L21A1/A2 37mm Baton Round
 L21A1/A2 155mm High Explosive Shell
 L21A1 5.56mm Ball Round
 L22
 L22A1 81mm Practice Mortar Bomb
 L22A1 5.56mm Ball Round
 L23
 L23A1/A2 120mm Armour Piercing Fin Stabilised Discarding Sabot Tank Shot
 L23A1 5.56mm Armour Piercing Round
 L26
 L26A1 120mm Armour Piercing Fin Stabilised Discarding Sabot Tank Shot
 L26A1 5.56mm Tracer Round
 L27
 L27A1 120mm Armour Piercing Fin Stabilised Discarding Sabot Tank Shot
 L27A1 5.56mm Blank Cartridge
 L28
 L28A1/A2 9mm Makarov Ball Round
 L28A1/A2 81mm Illuminating Parachute Mortar Bomb
 L28A1/A2 120mm Armour Piercing Fin Stabilised Discarding Sabot Tank Shot
 L29
 L29A1/A2 9mm Short Ball Round
 L29A1 120mm Discarding Sabot Training Tank Shot
 L31
 L31A1 5.56mm Ball Round ("Enhanced Performance" design based on the FN SS109 round but featuring an all-steel bullet for improved penetration and giving similar performance in both AR-15 and SA80 weapons)
 L31A1 7.62mm Blank Cartridge
 L31A1 9mm Ball Round (Sometimes referred to as a cartridge despite being a live round)
 L31A1/A2 7.62mm×39mm Short Blank Cartridge
 L31A1-A4 105mm High Explosive Shell
 L31A1-A7 120mm High Explosive Squash Head Tank Shot
 L32
 L32A1-A6 120mm Squash Head Practice Tank Shot
 L33
 L33A1 105mm Blank Cartridge
 L34
 L34A1/A2 120mm Smoke Tank Shot
 L37
 L37A1 7.62mm Ball Round
 L38
 L38A1 7.62mm Ball Round
 L38A1 105mm Blank Cartridge
 L39
 L39A1 81mm Illuminating Parachute Mortar Bomb
 L39A1 105mm Blank Cartridge
 L40
 L40A1/A2/A3  84mm High Explosive Anti-Tank Round
 L40A1 7.62mm Ball Round
 L40A1 105mm Blank Cartridge
 L41
 L41A1-A5 81mm High Explosive Mortar Bomb
 L41A1/A2/A3  84mm Practice Round
 L42
 L42A1/A2/A3 7.62mm Sniper Ball Round (Sniper-grade round manufactured to tighter standards)
 L42A1/A2/A3 81mm White Phosphorus Smoke Screening Mortar Bomb
 L43
 L43A1/A2/A3 7.62mm Blank Cartridge (Blank training round complement to L44A1)
 L43A1-A4 105mm Illuminating Parachute Shell
 L44
 L44A1 7.62mm Ball Round
 L45
 L45A1 7.62mm Tracer Round (Tracer round complement to L44A1)
 L45A1/A2 105mm Smoke Screening Shell
 L46
 L46A1 7.62mm Ball Round
 L52
 L52A1 105mm Smoke Screening Shell
 L53
 L53A1/A2 7.62mm×39mm Short Ball Round
 L54
 L54A1 81mm Illuminating Parachute Mortar Bomb
 L55
 L55A1/A2 7.62mm×54mm Long Ball Round
 L58
 L58A1 81mm Infra-Red Illuminating Parachute Mortar Bomb
 L59
 L59A1/A2 7.62mm High Performance Ball Round (Hardened steel tip)
 L60
 L60A1/A2 37mm Attenuated Energy Projectile Round

Notes

References 

Military equipment of the United Kingdom